Eric Nelson may refer to:

 Eric Nelson (musician) (active 2000s-), American choral conductor, clinician, and composer
 Eric Nelson (diplomat) (active 1990s-), American diplomat, Ambassador of the United States to Bosnia and Herzegovina
 Eric Nelson (historian) (born 1977), American historian and professor of government at Harvard University
 Eric Nelson (West Virginia politician) (born 1960), American state legislator in West Virginia
 Eric Nelson (Pennsylvania politician) (born 1968), member of the Pennsylvania House of Representatives
 Ricky Nelson (Eric Hilliard Nelson, 1940–1985), American actor, musician and singer-songwriter
 Eric Nelson (active 2021), American defense attorney who represented Derek Chauvin in State v. Chauvin

See also
 Eric Nelsen (born 1991), American actor